The ju-jitsu competition at the 2013 World Games was held from July 29 to 30 at the Evagelista Mora Coliseum in Cali, Colombia. 91 athletes, from 29 nations, participated in the tournament.

Participating nations

Medal table

Events

Duo

Men's fighting

Men's ne-waza

Women's fighting

Women's ne-waza

References

External links
 JJIF
 Ju-jitsu on IWGA website

 
2013 World Games
2013